TV Rudo or Televizija Rudo is a local Bosnian  public television channel based in Rudo municipality. It was established on 28 June 1993 as part of public municipality services.

References

External links 
 Official website of Rudo municipality
 Website of CRA BiH

Television channels and stations established in 1993
Television stations in Bosnia and Herzegovina